Siragugal is an Indian Tamil-language drama film written by Raadhika, produced by Kalanithi Maran, and co-directed by Manobala and Raadhika. Set in London, the film stars Raadhika and Vikram, while Devan plays a supporting role. It was released as a television film on Sun TV and had a positive response.

Plot
Valli (Raadhika)  is a home-maker who lives with her husband Vishwa and children:Aishwarya and Kousalya in London. Valli's husband does not have any affections towards her nor his children. He always insults and hurts his wife every time he gets a chance. Yet, Valli bares everything for her children. Valli's elder daughter Aishwariya always worries her mother with her adolescent nature and activities. Aishu never cares about her mother's feelings and hurts her equally as her father. But Valli is more bothered about the culture and traditions which her daughter does not care to follow.

Chandrasekar (Vikram) is a businessman who lives in London  with his daughters Deepa and Shilpa. He lives separately from his wife who was more concerned in Western lifestyle and unwilling to change her nature and live with him. Deepa and Aishwarya are good friends. One day both of them go for a date with some boys without the knowledge of their parents and meet with an accident. Valli tries to contact her husband who is out of station and finds that her husband is having an illegal affair with another woman named Lavanya. Vishwa is upset about this incident and also because Valli had come to know about his extra-marital affair. He leaves his family on a small quarrel with Valli, who begs him to pardon her for whatever she did. But, Vishwa tells Valli that she is not fit to be even his servant-maid. Aishwariya finds that root cause of all these incidents is herself and on self-pity she does not take steps to recover. Valli who wants nothing but her daughter's recovery goes to Lavanya's house to convince vishwa to return home. But Vishwa's mistress Lavanya, insults her and asks Valli to get out of her property.

Valli is quite shocked with the series of events in her recent life but wants to survive in London and takes steps for that. Chandrsekar urges Valli to start her own catering business as she is a talented cook and soon together start a restaurant business. Meanwhile, Aishwarya recovers from her accident. One day she finds that her father is with his mistress and hates him forever. Vishwa resigns his job due to his promotion with transfer to Australia so that he can be with Lavanya. But having spent all his money to settle his debts, he begs Lavanya for money. This makes her ignore him and even to the point where she starts going out with other guys. Chandrsekar wants to marry Valli and start a new family with both their daughters. He proposes to Valli. But Valli does not reciprocate. Vishwa sees his wife rising to a good position. He wants to use this opportunity so that he can get money always. Initially, he pretends to her that he feels insecure and wanted to join them. Valli agrees and asks him to come home. Vishwa comes home but his nature has not changed. He dominates Valli and wants to take control of her and the money.

When Chandrasekar and Valli discuss about expanding their business he insults him and asks him to get out. Valli understanding that living with Vishwa is going to be another nightmare asks him to move out of the house. Then Vishwa kidnaps his own daughter Kousalya and instructs Valli to come to a temple. Valli rushes to get her daughter back. Vishwa makes demands to free his daughter. But Valli replies that their marital relationship started at the temple of their homeland and shall be ended in this London temple. She is not interested to have any relationships and does not want to deviate from her culture. What she wants is to bring up her daughters with cultural values. Chandrasekar understands that her decision was not only for Vishwa but also for him. Chandrsekar re-unites with his wife. Valli takes back her daughter with her. When Vishwa calls his daughter Kousalya replies him, not to come home forever.

Cast
Radikaa as Valli
Vikram as Chandrasekar
Devan as Viswa
Rayaan as Kousalya
Joshna Fernando as Shilpa

Production
Kalanithi Maran had requested Radikaa to consider making a short film to be aired on Sun TV, and the film subsequently materialised with Manobala signed as director. After he left the project midway, Raadhika became the director. Actor Vikram agreed to appear in the film, after his other film during the period, Sethu (1999), was unable to find a distributor. Joshna Fernando, a cousin of Radhika's, was added to the cast to portray Vikram's daughter. The film was shot in fifteen days in London.

Soundtrack
Soundtrack was composed by Dhina.
Uyire Uyire - Dr. Narayanan

Legacy
The film's woman-centric plot has meant that reviewers drew comparison to the film, following the release of the Jyothika-starrer, 36 Vayadhinile (2015).

References

1990s Tamil-language films
1999 films
Films about women in India
Indian feminist films
Indian television films
Films directed by Manobala
Films set in London
Films shot in London